Sheela Rajkumar is an Indian actress and Bharatanatyam dancer who has worked predominantly in Tamil films.

Career
Sheela is a Bharatanatyam dancer and a trainer. She joined the Chennai-based theatre group Koothu-P-Pattarai where she was performing theatrical arts. Sheela also worked in short films for Kalaignar TV's reality show Naalaya Iyakunar.

In 2016, she played a small role in Arivazhagan's Aarathu Sinam. Her next film To Let was screened at numerous film festivals in 2017 and 2018, and was theatrically released on 21 February 2019. It won the National Film Award for Best Feature Film in Tamil. She was then roped in her first Tamil serial as a leading role in Azhagiya Tamil Magal telecasted in Zee Tamil. In 2018, she appeared in the thriller film Asuravadham. The next year, she acted in Namma Veettu Pillai and in the Malayalam-language film Kumbalangi Nights. In 2020, she played the title role in Draupathi which was censured for its regressive take on caste politics. A year later, she was featured in the progressive political satire, Mandela, which mocks casteism. Later she said she was not aware of Draupathi's politics.

Filmography

Television

WEB SERIES

Awards & Nominations

References 

Living people
Tamil actresses
Tamil television actresses
Actresses in Tamil television
Actresses in Tamil cinema
Indian film actresses
People from Thanjavur
Performers of Indian classical dance
Bharatanatyam exponents
21st-century Indian actresses
Indian female classical dancers
Year of birth missing (living people)
Actresses in Malayalam cinema